Leni Lynn (born Angelina Ciofani; May 3, 1923 – January 1, 2010) was an American actress and a contralto singer. She was also known as Leni Hoffer.

The daughter of a Pasaic, New Jersey, factory worker, Francesco Ciofani, and his wife, Carmelita, Lynn learned to sing by listening to recordings. When she was 13, friends and neighbors in Pasaic contributed 10,000 dimes to send her to Hollywood to try for success in films. On September 6, 1938, she received a contract from MGM.

Lynn was married four times. In 1942, she married British insurance executive Edward Thomas Hopkin; they divorced on March 23, 1949. Her last husband, composer and conductor Bernard Hoffer, survived her.

On January 1, 2010, Lynn died of complications of a stroke in Croton-on-Hudson, New York. She was 86.

Selected filmography
 Babes in Arms (1939)
 Hullabaloo (1940)
 Angels with Broken Wings (1941)
 Heaven Is Round the Corner (1944)
 Give Me the Stars (1945)
 Gaiety George (1946)
 Spring Song (1946)

References

External links
 

1923 births
2010 deaths
American film actresses
Metro-Goldwyn-Mayer contract players
Actors from Waterbury, Connecticut
People from Croton-on-Hudson, New York
Actresses from Connecticut
Actresses from New York (state)
20th-century American actresses
21st-century American women